New Leake is a village and civil parish in the East Lindsey district of  Lincolnshire, England. The population of the civil parish at the 2011 census was 323.

St Judes Mission church lies within the village of New Leake. It appears to have been built and opened around 1896.  It is part of the Stickney Group of churches

East Fen Chapel was a Primitive Methodist chapel originally built in 1831, but was replaced by a new building in 1855. It closed in 1969.

New Leake primary school was built in 1890, originally as the New Leake Board School, by the United School Board of the parishes of Old and New Leake (1881-1903).

References

External links

New Leake Primary School

Villages in Lincolnshire
Civil parishes in Lincolnshire
East Lindsey District